Antonio Timothy German (born 26 December 1991) is a footballer who plays as a winger or a forward for Leatherhead and the Grenada national football team.

Club career

Early career
Born in Park Royal, London, German progressed through the Queens Park Rangers' (QPR) youth system before being promoted to the first team in May 2009.

Queens Park Rangers
German signed his first professional contract with QPR in June 2009 and was given shirt number 33. German made his debut against Plymouth Argyle in the club's final home game of the 2008–09 season, coming on as a second-half substitute. He scored his first goal in his full debut in a 2–1 victory over against Doncaster Rovers on 21 February 2010, where he bagged the first goal of the game. In the same game he had a header disallowed for offside and also a header looping just over the top of the bar. Five days after scoring his first goal, German signed a new deal with QPR until June 2012. On 20 March 2010, German scored his second goal in a 1–1 draw against Swansea City.

Loan spells with Aldershot Town, Southend United and Yeovil Town
On 5 October 2009, German joined Aldershot Town on a month's loan and made four appearances. In November 2010, German went on a month's loan to Southend United (along with teammate Jack Midson) and scored a penalty on his debut against Macclesfield Town in the FA Cup. German's loan spell was extended until 3 January, before he was recalled by Neil Warnock. On 10 February 2011, German joined Yeovil Town on loan until the end of the season, but returned to QPR after only a month.

Stockport County
Following QPR's promotion to the Premier League, German was expected to depart and was not given a squad number. On 2 September 2011, he joined Conference Premier side Stockport County after his QPR contract was cancelled. German scored his first goal against Telford United in a 1–1 draw and scored twice against Fleetwood Town in a 2–4 loss. He left the club in January 2012 when his contract ended.

Bromley
On 13 January 2012 German signed for Conference South side Bromley on a non-contract terms.

Brentford
After making two appearances for Bromley, German signed an 18-month contract at League One side Brentford after a trial. He made his debut as a half time substitute in a 2–0 away defeat to Leyton Orient. German made his first appearance of the 2012–13 season on 9 October, coming on as a substitute in a 1–0 Football League Trophy win over Crawley Town. He made his next appearance over a month later in the league against Preston North End, coming on as a substitute and scoring an 89th-minute equaliser, his only goal for the club. He made three more substitute appearances in the 2012–13 season.

Gillingham (loan)
On 26 February, German signed for League Two side Gillingham on a month's loan. He went straight into the squad for Gillingham's league match against Oxford United that night, coming on as a 79th-minute substitute in a 1–0 defeat. Two games later at home to Plymouth Argyle, he received his first start and scored his first Gillingham goal. He made four more non-goalscoring appearances before returning to Brentford after the completion of his loan.

Gillingham
On 27 June 2013, German signed for newly promoted Gillingham on a permanent basis after rejecting the offer of a new contract at Brentford. He was made available for transfer by Martin Allen on 13 September.

Northampton Town (loan)
On 1 January 2014, German signed for Northampton Town on a month-long loan. This was later extended until the end of the season.

Aldershot Town (loan)
On 27 February 2015, German signed for Aldershot Town on a one-month loan. After finding the net once in six appearances for The Shots, the club decided against extending his loan spell and the striker returned to Gillingham.

Kerala Blasters 
German signed for Kerala Blasters in August 2015. During his spell at the club, he was widely praised for his performances, scoring six goals in nine games.

Partick Thistle
German signed for Scottish Premiership club Partick Thistle on 1 February 2016 until the end of the 2015–16 season. German made his debut for the club as a substitute in a 3–1 away defeat to Motherwell. On 11 April 2016 German's contract was terminated by mutual consent for personal reasons.

Gokulam Kerala
On 5 May 2018, German joined Indian club Gokulam Kerala. He left the club citing personal reasons on 6 December.

Selangor
On 1 January 2019, German joined the Malaysian club Selangor on a one-year-deal for a free transfer. However, he was let go by the club in February. German later said he left the club due to racism.

Leatherhead
On 14 January 2022, German signed for Isthmian League Premier Division side Leatherhead.

International career
On 13 October 2018, German made his debut for the Grenada national football team, playing the last 27 minutes in a 2–0 loss to Cuba in a CONCACAF Nations League qualifying match.

Personal life
He is the older brother of former Chesterfield and current Crawley Town forward Ricky German.

Career statistics

International goals
Scores and results list Grenada's goal tally first.

References

External links
 
 
 

1991 births
Living people
Black British sportspeople
English sportspeople of Grenadian descent
Footballers from Park Royal
English footballers
Grenadian footballers
Association football forwards
Queens Park Rangers F.C. players
Aldershot Town F.C. players
Southend United F.C. players
Yeovil Town F.C. players
Stockport County F.C. players
Bromley F.C. players
Brentford F.C. players
Gillingham F.C. players
Northampton Town F.C. players
Kerala Blasters FC players
Partick Thistle F.C. players
Ebbsfleet United F.C. players
Hemel Hempstead Town F.C. players
St Albans City F.C. players
Gokulam Kerala FC players
Selangor FA players
Leatherhead F.C. players
English Football League players
National League (English football) players
Indian Super League players
I-League players
Malaysia Super League players
Scottish Professional Football League players
Grenada international footballers
English expatriate footballers
Grenadian expatriate footballers
English expatriate sportspeople in India
English expatriate sportspeople in Malaysia
Grenadian expatriate sportspeople in India
Grenadian expatriate sportspeople in Malaysia
Expatriate footballers in India
Expatriate footballers in Malaysia